Tettigonia viridissima, the great green bush-cricket, is a large species of bush-cricket belonging to the subfamily Tettigoniinae.

Distribution and habitat

Description
This insect is most often completely green (but there are specimens completely yellowish or with yellow legs), excluding a rust-colored band on top of the body. The organ of the stridulation of the males is generally brown.

Tettigonia viridissima is distinguished by its very long and thin antennae, which can sometimes reach up to three times the length of the body, thus differentiating them from grasshoppers, which always carry short antennae. It could be confused with Tettigonia cantans, whose wings are a centimeter shorter than the ovipositor, or Tettigonia caudata whose hind femurs bear conspicuous black spines.

It reaches the end of the elytra and is slightly curved downward.

The larvae are green and as the imago show on their back a thin brown longitudinal stripe. The ovipositor can be seen from the fifth stage; the wings appear in both genders from the sixth stage.

Biology
Tettigonia viridissima is carnivorous and arboreal. Its diet is mostly composed of flies, caterpillars and larvae. Unlike grasshoppers, it is essentially active in day and night, as testified by its endless crepuscular and nocturnal singing. The species can bite painfully but is not particularly aggressive. It is best to avoid holding the insect in the fist, as that almost guarantees a bite. They can fly, but they tend to avoid flying where possible. Most often they move "on foot" or jumps, which allow them to travel about in bushes and trees.

Gallery

References

External links

 Video of Tettigonia viridissima in a tree
 Insectes-net
 Tettigonia viridissima
 Green grasshopper eating a butterfly

Tettigoniinae
Insects described in 1758
Articles containing video clips
Orthoptera of Europe
Taxa named by Carl Linnaeus